Mascaromyia is a genus of flies in the family Dolichopodidae, endemic to the western Indian Ocean islands. It is named after the main distribution of the genus, the islands of the submarine Mascarene Plateau, combining it with "myia" (the Greek word for fly).

Species

 Mascaromyia albitarsis (Parent, 1935)
 Mascaromyia alexisi Grichanov, 2004
 Mascaromyia amplicaudata (Lamb, 1922)
 Mascaromyia babichae Grichanov, 1996
 Mascaromyia bebourensis Grichanov, 2004
 Mascaromyia bickeli Grichanov, 1996
 Mascaromyia brooksi Grichanov, 2004
 Mascaromyia courtoisi Grichanov, 2020
 Mascaromyia cummingi Grichanov, 2004
 Mascaromyia desjardinsi (Macquart, 1842)
 Mascaromyia duplicata (Parent, 1932)
 Mascaromyia dytei Grichanov, 1996
 Mascaromyia frolovi Grichanov, 1996
 Mascaromyia grandicaudata (Lamb, 1922)
 Mascaromyia grimaldii Grichanov, 2004
 Mascaromyia hutsoni Grichanov, 1996
 Mascaromyia indistincta (Lamb, 1922)
 Mascaromyia leptogaster (Thomson, 1869)
 Mascaromyia loici Grichanov, 2004
 Mascaromyia magnicaudata (Lamb, 1922)
 Mascaromyia makhotkini Grichanov, 1996
 Mascaromyia martirei Grichanov, 2017
 Mascaromyia mauritiensis (Parent, 1939)
 Mascaromyia michaeli Grichanov, 2004
 Mascaromyia parallela (Macquart, 1842)
 Mascaromyia pollicifera (Lamb, 1922)
 Mascaromyia rochati Grichanov, 2020
 Mascaromyia rufiventris (Macquart, 1842)
 Mascaromyia shabuninae Grichanov, 1996
 Mascaromyia tatyanae Grichanov, 2004
 Mascaromyia vagabunda (Lamb, 1926)

References

Sciapodinae
Dolichopodidae genera
Diptera of Africa